"Who Wants to Be Alone" is a song by Dutch DJ and record producer Tiësto, featuring Canadian singer Nelly Furtado. The track was released as the third single from Tiësto's fourth studio album, Kaleidoscope, on 21 March 2010.

Charts

Weekly charts

Year-end charts

References

2009 songs
2010 singles
Tiësto songs
Nelly Furtado songs
Number-one singles in Poland
Song recordings produced by DJ Frank E
Songs written by Rick Nowels
Songs written by Nelly Furtado